"ATR" ("Atari Teenage Riot") is a song by Atari Teenage Riot, released as their first single in 1993. It was later included on their debut album Delete Yourself!.

Track listings
CD version
"ATR"
"ATR" (Urban Riot Mix)
"Midi Junkies"
"Midi Junkies" (Berlin Mix)

Cassette version
"ATR" - 3:09
"ATR" (Urban Riot Mix) - 3:08
"Midi Junkies" - 5:02
"Midi Junkies" (Berlin Mix) - 6:20
"ATR" (Radio Bleep Version) - 3:09

12" vinyl
Side A
"ATR"
"ATR" (Urban Riot Mix)
Side B
"Midi Junkies"
"Midi Junkies" (Berlin Mix)

12" vinyl promo
Side A
"ATR" (Urban Riot Mix)
Side B
"Midijunkies" (Berlin Mix)

External links
"ATR" cassette at Discogs
"ATR" CD at Discogs
"ATR" UK 12" at Discogs
"ATR" Germany 12" at Discogs
"ATR" 12" promo at Discogs

1993 singles
Atari Teenage Riot songs
1993 songs
Phonogram Records singles